Just One is a cooperative party game for 3 to 7 players, designed by Ludovic Roudy and Bruno Sautter and published by Repos Production in 2018. In each round of the game, players write down a one word clue for the round's guesser, who must figure out the secret word for the round. Identical clues are discarded before the guesser sees them.

Just One won the 2019 Spiel des Jahres award for the best board game of the year.

Gameplay

The game is played over 13 rounds, during which players give one word clues to the round's guesser to help that person guess the hidden word for the round. Duplicate clues are removed before the guesser sees them, so giving clues which are too obvious can backfire. A right guess scores a point while a wrong one loses a point, with players trying to score as high as possible over the game's rounds. A typical game takes about 20 minutes.

Awards

Just One won the 2019 Spiel Des Jahres award, with the jury saying the game was ingenious for its simplicity. The game was also nominated for the 2018 Golden Geek awards in the Party category.

References

External links

Board games introduced in 2018
Spiel des Jahres winners